Blue Box is a BBC Books original novel written by Kate Orman and based on the long-running British science fiction television series Doctor Who. It features the Sixth Doctor and Peri, written from a first-person perspective by a fictional journalist, in a similar manner to Who Killed Kennedy by David Bishop. The character Ian Mond is named after a well-known fan who is a member of various internet forums including Jade Pagoda and the Outpost Gallifrey forums.

The title of this novel does not refer to the TARDIS, but to the blue box used by phreakers, and by analogy, the alien hacking tool that is the book's MacGuffin.

External links

2003 British novels
2003 science fiction novels
Past Doctor Adventures
Sixth Doctor novels
Novels by Kate Orman
British science fiction novels